German submarine U-3508 was a Type XXI U-boat of Nazi Germany's Kriegsmarine during World War II. The Elektroboote submarine was laid down on 25 July 1944 at the Schichau-Werke yard at Danzig, launched on 22 September 1944, and commissioned on 2 November 1944 under the command of Oberleutnant zur See Detlef von Lehsten.
 
He commanded the U-boat during her entire career, being promoted to Kapitänleutnant during this time. She did not carry out any patrols during her career, spending her entire time in training after having been allocated to the 8th U-boat Flotilla until 15 February 1945, then to the 5th U-boat Flotilla from 16 February until 4 March.

Design
Like all Type XXI U-boats, U-3508 had a displacement of  when at the surface and  while submerged. The submarine was powered by two MAN SE supercharged six-cylinder M6V40/46KBB diesel engines each providing , two Siemens-Schuckert GU365/30 double-acting electric motors each providing , and two Siemens-Schuckert silent running GV232/28 electric motors each providing .

U-3508 was fitted with six  torpedo tubes in the bow and four  C/30 anti-aircraft guns. She could carry twenty-three torpedoes or seventeen torpedoes and twelve mines. The complement was five officers and fifty-two men.

Fate
She was sunk on 4 March 1945 in an Allied bombing raid by US Eighth Air Force B-24 Liberator bombers on Wilhelmshaven.

References

Bibliography

External links
 

Type XXI submarines
U-boats commissioned in 1944
U-boats sunk in 1945
World War II submarines of Germany
1944 ships
Ships built in Danzig
U-boats sunk by US aircraft
Ships built by Schichau
Maritime incidents in March 1945